Covenant Health is an integrated health system organization based in Knoxville, Tennessee, with operations throughout the Knoxville metropolitan area.

Covenant Health was formed in 1996 by the merger of Fort Sanders Health System of Knoxville with the organization that operated Methodist Medical Center of Oak Ridge.

Covenant Health had an operating income of $38.3 million in 2020. They received a total of $92.5 million in government relief from the CARES Act and other funding.

References

External links
 

Healthcare in Tennessee
Knoxville metropolitan area
Organizations established in 1996